The Lepidoptera of the Selvagens Islands consist of both the butterflies and moths recorded from the Selvagens Islands (Savage Islands), a small Portuguese archipelago in the North Atlantic.

According to a recent estimate, there are 21 Lepidoptera species in the Selvagens Islands.

Butterflies
No butterflies have been recorded from the Selvagens Islands.

Moths

Crambidae
Nomophila noctuella (Denis & Schiffermuller, 1775)
Palpita vitrealis (Rossi, 1794)

Noctuidae
Abrostola canariensis Hampson, 1913
Agrotis lanzarotensis Rebel, 1894
Agrotis segetum (Denis & Schiffermuller, 1775)
Autographa gamma (Linnaeus, 1758)
Cardepia affinis (Rothschild, 1913)
Euxoa canariensis Rebel, 1902
Helicoverpa armigera (Hübner, 1808)
Heliothis peltigera (Denis & Schiffermuller, 1775)
Spodoptera exigua (Hübner, 1808)
Trichoplusia ni (Hübner, 1803)

Pterophoridae
Agdistis bifurcatus Agenjo, 1952
Agdistis salsolae Walsingham, 1908

Pyralidae
Ancylosis roscidella (Eversmann, 1844)

Sphingidae
Hyles livornica (Esper, 1780)
Macroglossum stellatarum (Linnaeus, 1758)

Tineidae
Trichophaga bipartitella (Ragonot, 1892)
Trichophaga robinsoni Gaedike & Karsholt, 2001

Tortricidae
Acroclita subsequana (Herrich-Schäffer, 1851)
Selania leplastriana (Curtis, 1831)

External links
Fauna Europaea

Selvagens Islands
Lepidoptera
Selvagens Islands
 Selvagens Islands
Selvagens Islands
Selvagens Islands